Riley Dean (born 10 August 2001) is a professional rugby league footballer who plays for Warrington Wolves in the Super League.

Club career

Warrington Wolves
In 2019 he made his Super League début for Warrington against St Helens.

York City Knights (loan)
On 25 Feb 2021 it was reported that he had signed on loan for the York City Knights in the RFL Championship.

International
On 16 April 2020 it was announced that Dean had been called up to the Ireland squad for the upcoming 2021 Rugby League World Cup qualifiers. Captained the first ever Ireland RL U16 team.

References

External links
Warrington Wolves profile
SL profile

2001 births
Living people
Dewsbury Rams players
English rugby league players
English people of Irish descent
Featherstone Rovers players
Newcastle Thunder players
Rugby league halfbacks
Rugby league players from Halifax, West Yorkshire
Warrington Wolves players
York City Knights players